Ta'um (also spelled Tu'um or Taoum) is a village in northern Syria, administratively part of the Idlib Governorate, located northeast of Idlib. Nearby localities include Binnish to the southwest, al-Fu'ah to the west, Zardana to the north, Taftanaz to the northeast, Talhiyah to the east and Iffis to the southeast. According to the Syria Central Bureau of Statistics, Ta'um had a population of 3,054 in the 2004 census.

References

Populated places in Idlib District